Elections to East Lothian Council were held on 4 May 2017 on the same day as the other Scottish local government elections. The election consisted of 6 wards electing three or four councillors using the single transferable vote system form of proportional representation, with 22 councillors elected.

This election featured revised ward boundaries to three wards resulting in the reduction of the number of East Lothian councillors from 23 to 22. Two former Musselburgh wards were merged, while losing Wallyford and Whitecraig with 4 councillors being elected. The bulk of the previous Fa'side ward became Tranent/Wallyford/Macmerry. Haddington and Lammermuir ward expanded with the addition of Ormiston and Pencaitland and gained a councillor.

Following the elections, Labour announced that they would form a minority administration. This replaced the previous coalition between Labour, the Conservatives and the one Independent councillor.

Election result

Note: "Votes" are the first preference votes. The net gain/loss and percentage changes relate to the result of the previous Scottish local elections on 3 May 2012. This may differ from other published sources showing gain/loss relative to seats held at dissolution of Scotland's councils.

Ward results

Musselburgh
2012: 
Musselburgh West (2xSNP; 1xLab)
Musselburgh East and Carberry (1xIndependent; 1xSNP; 1xLab)
2017: 2xSNP 1xConservative 1xLab
2012-2017 Change: 2 wards combined due to ward change resulting in one less councillor for Musselburgh. Conservative gain one seat.

Preston, Seton and Gosford
2012: 2xLabour 2xSNP 
2017: 2xLabour 1xSNP 1xCON
2012-2017 Change: Conservative gain one seat from SNP

Tranent/Wallyford/Macmerry
2012: 3xLabour 1xSNP (as Fa'side ward)
2017: 2xLabour 1xSNP 1xConservative
2012-2017 Change: Conservatives gain one seat from Labour

North Berwick Coastal
2012: 1xLabour 1xConservative 1xSNP
2017: 2xCon 1xLabour
2012-2017 Change: Conservatives gain one seat from SNP

Haddington and Lammermuir
2012: 1xConservative 1xLabour 1xSNP
2017: 1xConservative 2xLabour 1xSNP
2012-2017 Change: No change

Dunbar and East Linton
2012: 1xLabour 1xConservative 1xSNP
2017: 1xLabour 1xConservative 1xSNP
2012-2017 Change: No change

Retiring councillors

Changes since 2017
† On 26 February 2019, Haddington and Lammermuir Councillor Brian Small resigned his seat. A by-election followed was held on 9 May 2019. The seat was won by Craig Hoy of the Conservative Party.
†† On 24 October 2021, Preston, Seton and Gosford Councillor and Leader of East Lothian Council, Willie Innes, passed away after a long illness.

By-elections since 2017

References

2017
2017 Scottish local elections